Audiotopsy is an American heavy metal band from Peoria, Illinois, formed in 2015. The band's current lineup consists of lead vocalist and rhythm guitarist Billy Keeton, lead guitarist and backing vocalist James Vinson, bassist and backing vocalist Perry Stern, and drummer Trevor Bodkins.

History

Formation and Natural Causes (2015–2017)
The band formed in 2015 after Greg Tribbett left Hellyeah along with bassist Bob "Zilla" Kahaka.

The band's debut studio album, Natural Causes, was released on October 2, 2015 via Napalm Records. It was self-produced and engineered by Tim Laud. The tracks "Headshot" and "The Calling" premiered on Loudwire and Revolver respectively.

The Real Now and line up change (2018–present)

In September of 2017 the band announced recording had begun on a second studio album, set for release in 2018. The band's second album The Real Now was released on November 2, via Megaforce Records. Two singles were released in promotion of the record, "What Am I" (September 7, 2018) and "War" (October 11, 2018). In 2021, Greg Tribbett and Matthew McDonough left Audiotopsy following to the reformation of Mudvayne. They were both replaced by James Vinson on lead guitar and backing vocals, and Trevor Bodkins on drums.

Musical style
Tribbett refers to Audiotopsy as 'progressive hard rock'. The band has also been categorized in the media as heavy metal, alternative metal, groove metal, and post-grunge. In their review for Natural Causes, Ghost Cult Magazine wrote "On paper the idea of Tribbett and McDonough working together again seems awesome, but the angular and off-kilter Mudvayne rhythms are nowhere to be found here. The closest we get to those days is on 'Distorted' and 'Darken the Rainbow,' but even then it's more Lost and Found rather than L.D. 50. And that's fine because this is a new band and they're capable of producing their own interesting moments."

Band members

Current

 Billy Keeton – lead vocals, rhythm guitar (2015–present)
 Perry Stern – bass, backing vocals (2015–present)
 James Vinson – lead guitar, backing vocals (2021–present) 
 Trevor Bodkins – drums (2021–present)

Former

 Greg Tribbett – lead guitar, backing vocals (2015–2021)
 Matthew McDonough – drums (2015–2021)

Discography
Studio albums

 Natural Causes (2015)
 The Real Now (2018)

References

External links
Audiotopsy on AllMusic

Musical groups established in 2015
Heavy metal supergroups
Progressive rock musical groups from Illinois
2015 establishments in Illinois